is a video game based on the Kamen Rider Series, released for the PlayStation 4 and Nintendo Switch on October 29, 2020. It features the cast from Kamen Rider W, Kamen Rider OOO and Kamen Rider Zero-One.

The storyline is heavily focus on both Kamen Rider W and OOO, due to the absences of other Kamen Rider Zero-One cast aside Zero-One himself.

Plot
The Narumi Detective Agency receive an email from a client requesting them to find "Professor Aida" with Shotaro Hidari leaving to investigate the island-based Sector City, once a tourist hotspot until an accident made it uninhabitable while emitting a strange energy. Shotaro meets with Kamen Riders OOO and Zero-One to uncover the mystery behind Aida and stop a Foundation X scientist reviving their old enemies and fallen allies as immortal super soldiers under his control.

Characters

 
 The game's main antagonist, a Foundation X scientist who assumed his current form using the Zeus Memory, overseeing Aida's eternal super soldier project using the foundation's research on Gaia Memories, O Medals, and Necro-Overs in hopes of reviving her. He created Sector City's Central Tower to energize the Core Energy, which revives both fallen enemies and allies of both Kamen Riders W and OOO. The tower he created also draws Kamen Rider Zero-One to the prime universe, which might explain why the other cast from Zero-One are not present in the game. Ultimately, he and other Kamen Riders found out that Aida was using them all along. Once Aida had been defeated by Zero-One, OOO, and W, Zeus ultimately join Ankh and Nazca in sacrificing their lives destroying Sector City and foiling Aida's plan.

 
 An amnesiac artificial intelligence who is stuck inside a floating robot body, serving as the player's navigator before the near end of the game revealing her true identity. But she transplanted her mind into Ai, initially a support drone for Sector City, manipulating the Kamen Riders and the Zeus Dopant before revealing herself while transferring her mind into Muchiri to achieve immortality as a Greeed. Philip was planning to fix Ai after the crisis is over, but the outcome after Aida was revived inside Muchiri caused him unable to find a way to fix her, despite having had aware of Aida's presence inside Ai from the beginning.

 
 A man-made arthropod Greeed created by Zeus to revive Aida with unlimited access to Core Energy, Aida betraying Zeus once obtaining her power before being destroyed with her vessel. Some of the Core Medals that compose Muchiri are taken by Kamen Rider OOO to assume Mukachiri Combo form.

Playable Characters
Kamen Rider W
 Forms: CycloneJoker, HeatJoker, LunaJoker, CycloneMetal, HeatMetal, LunaMetal, CycloneTrigger, HeatTrigger, LunaTrigger, CycloneJoker Xtreme
 Note: CycloneJoker Gold Xtreme appears in the game's finale, but is not a playable form
Kamen Rider W FangJoker
Kamen Rider Joker
Kamen Rider Accel
 Forms: Base, Accel Booster, Trial
Kamen Rider OOO
 Forms: Tatoba Combo, Gatakiriba Combo, Latoratah Combo, Sagohzo Combo, Shauta Combo, Tajador Combo, Burakawani Combo, Mukachiri Combo, Putotyra Combo
 Note: Mukachiri Combo debuted in this game
Kamen Rider Birth (Shintaro Goto)
 Forms: Base, Birth Day
Kamen Rider Birth Prototype (Akira Date) 
Kamen Rider Zero-One
 Forms: Rising Hopper, Rising Hopper - Flying Falcon, Shining Assault Hopper, Metal Cluster Hopper, Kamen Rider Zero-Two

Italic denotes for New Game+ exclusive character(s)/form(s)
Bold denotes for default form
Bold Italic denotes for final form

Voice Cast
Rather than being reprised by their original actors, the cast from both Kamen Rider W and OOO are being voiced by different voice actors with Fumiya Takahashi returning to voice Zero-One. The Zeus Dopant and Ai are voiced by Takehito Koyasu and Yukari Tamura, respectively.

Reception

The Nintendo Switch version of Kamen Rider: Memory of Heroez sold 11,683 physical copies within its first week on sale in Japan, making it the eighth bestselling retail game of the week in the country. The PlayStation 4 version sold 9,286 physical copies in Japan throughout the same week.

References

External links

Kamen Rider video games
Bandai Namco games
Action video games
Hack and slash games
Bandai Namco Entertainment franchises
PlayStation 4 games
2020 video games
Nintendo Switch games
Single-player video games
Video games developed in Japan
Video games about parallel universes